This is a list of holidays in Brunei.

Public holidays

References 

 
Bruneian culture
Brunei